Straight dough is a single-mix process of making bread.  The dough is made from all fresh ingredients, and they are all placed together and combined in one kneading or mixing session.  After mixing, a bulk fermentation rest of about 1 hour or longer occurs before division.  It is also called the direct dough method.

Formula

A straight dough formula might look like this:

{| class=wikitable style="text-align:center;"
|-
! align=left colspan=2 | Baker'spercentage
|-
! align=left | ingredient  || %
|-
| align=left | flour ||  100% 
|-
| align=left | water || 60%
|-
| align=left | sugar || 4%
|-
| align=left | fat || 4%
|-
| align=left | yeast || 1%–5%
|-
| align=left | salt || 2%
|}

Process

In general, the process steps for making straight dough are as follows:

Mise en place: The first step is to look at the formula ("recipe"), familiarize yourself with the ingredients and process, get ready to perform the task at hand. Assess the availability of tools, consider the batch size and time schedule, and gather what is needed.
Weigh ingredients: This is also called scaling.  If more yeast is chosen for the initial mixing and it is viable, faster fermentation occurs. If too much yeast is used the result is a noticeable yeast flavor.
Mixing: The ingredients are all placed in a mixing bowl at once and combined.  A variation of this technique is to add ingredients sequentially.  This mixing process may be done by hand kneading or by machine. Once fermentation has commenced, it will continue until the heat of the oven kills the yeast during baking. For fast fermentations, long, intense mixing techniques are recommended for dough development, whereas for long-fermented doughs, short-mixing techniques on slow speeds or hand kneading may be used with sufficient later folding.

It is known that mixing adds heat to dough, and more intense mixing adds heat more quickly. Oxidation results in loss of color and flavor. Bakers sometimes substitute a weight of crushed ice for some of the dough's water to compensate for the expected temperature rise, while other bakers use "water-jacketed or refrigerated mixer bowls" to keep the dough cooler during mixing.

The container is often covered so the dough remains in a humid environment, ideal is 74–77% relative humidity. Without some humidity the dough surface will tend to dry and develop a skin. As the dough rests, it will expand in volume due to the carbon dioxide created as it ferments. The dough will expand to a certain point, then volume growth will stall, and eventually the peak of the dough will begin to fall. When it reaches this point, it is at about 66–70% of its total fermentation time.

Stretch and folds or degassing: When the dough reaches a specified size or scheduled time it is removed from the bowl and stretched and folded on a flour-dusted surface for the purposes of degassing the bubbles that have formed as well as stretching and aligning the gluten, then it is returned to the bowl for continued bulk fermentation. Prior to folding, the dough surfaces that are folded together should be brushed to remove excess dry flour. This is also called knock back or punch down, and may occur in an oiled bowl followed by a few folds, then flipped over so the seam side is down. This stretching and folding develops the gluten and equalizes the dough temperature. Long bulk fermentations may have as many as 4 to 5 folding sessions.  Some schedules begin degassing at half the total fermentation time, while others degas once just before the peak begins to fall.  A fermentation ratio is described as the time the dough takes from leaving the mixer to just before the peak begins to fall — when degassing occurs — relative to the remaining bulk fermentation time afterwards.  Folding or knock back may also be omitted: after sufficient bulk fermentation time, the dough may go straight to make-up.

Make-up

Dividing:  This is also called scaling or portioning. The bulk dough is divided to smaller, final weights.  This step is used when making more than one loaf of bread, or many rolls.

Pre-shaping or rounding:  The dough pieces are made into oval, cylinder, or round shapes, depending upon the shape's appropriateness to the final product.

Bench or intermediate proofing:  A rest period of 8 to 30 minutes follows which allows the dough to relax, easing shaping.

Shaping:  Each piece of dough is manipulated into its desired final shape, and either placed on proofing trays or panned. It is also called, makeup and panning or moulding and panning.

Proofing [or, outside USA, Proving]:  The final fermentation rest before baking. Like bulk fermentation, proofing is ideally done in a humidity- and temperature-controlled environment. The proofing dough rests and ferments until it reaches about 85% of its final volume.
Scoring:   If desired, proofed dough is scored with a lame or razor to slash the top of the dough to direct oven-spring expansion.  It is also used for its decorative effect.
Baking:  The proofed dough is loaded into a hot oven for baking. During the first few minutes, the remaining rise will occur in the dough and is known as oven spring.
Cooling:  Once the bread is fully baked, it is removed to racks to cool.

History
The straight dough method became popular after the discovery and later mass production of baker's yeast, as well as the mass production of mixing machines. Straight dough was simpler than sponge and dough, took less time and effort, and was considered superior for commercial purposes.  Baking expert Julius Emil Wihlfahrt of The Fleischmann Company wrote in 1915:

Prior to 1920, there were two basic kinds of breads, naturally leavened French bread, and Vienna bread leavened with cereal press yeast, an early form of baker's yeast.  After 1920, when mixing machines became popular among bakers, rural bakers began to make more sponge doughs and city bakers more straight doughs, both replacing sourdough.  By the 1930s, straight dough had mostly replaced sponge dough, and the terms "French" and "Vienna" breads were used less often. Bakers who continued using older methods were generally unable in America to compete on a cost basis, and so with "rare exceptions," were limited to local niche markets.

See also

 Pre-ferment
 Proofing

Notes

Footnotes

References

External links

 Straight dough at Bakerpedia.

Baking
Breads
Cooking techniques